The Great Eastern Shipping Company Limited is India's largest private sector shipping company which mainly transports liquid, gas and solid bulk products. The company has two segments in their business: Shipping & Offshore. The shipping business is involved in transportation of crude oil, petroleum products, Liquified gas and dry bulk commodities. The offshore business; services the oil companies in carrying out offshore exploration and production activities through its wholly owned subsidiary Greatship (India) Limited, which has its corporate headquarters in Mumbai. The shipping business has been awarded the ISO 9001: 2000 standard certification by DNV.

G E Shipping was founded by the Sheths and the Bhiwandiwallas, who started their own shipping line to help expand the reach of their trading businesses. In 1948, after obtaining the mothballed Liberty ship, SS Fort Elice, G E Shipping began its maiden voyage under the entrepreneurial genius of Vasant J. Sheth and steered ahead confidently, tasting new waters and exploring new avenues. As of 2007 it had some 944 employees including sailing staff. It is listed on India's two main stock exchanges i. e. the Bombay Stock Exchange and the National Stock Exchange.

References
Story of Great Eastern Shipping 

https://www.greatship.com/story-of-ges.html

Shipping companies of India
Companies based in Mumbai
Transport companies established in 1948
Indian companies established in 1948
Companies listed on the National Stock Exchange of India
Companies listed on the Bombay Stock Exchange